The 1040s BC is a decade which lasted from 1049 BC to 1040 BC.

Events and trends
 1048 BC—Medon, King of Athens, dies after a reign of 20 years and is succeeded by his son Acastus.
 1046 BC—Following the Battle of Muye, King Wu of Zhou overthrows the Shang Dynasty under the Chinese King Di Xin, and establishes the Zhou Dynasty (1046 BC–256 BC). 
 1044 BC—On the death of Smendes I, king of Egypt, he is succeeded by two co-regents, Psusennes I and Neferkare Amenemnisu.
 c. 1042 BC—Beginning of the Rebellion of the Three Guards. Guanshu Xian and Caishu Du instigate Shang loyalists under Wu Geng to revolt.
1041 BC—Some sources propose this as the date of King David's birth

Significant people
Shu Du of Cai
 Ashur-rabi II, king of Assyria, is born (approximate date).

References